Bergen-Hiltrop is a statistical area of the city of Bochum in the Ruhr area in Germany. Up to  the 19th century  Westphalian was spoken here. Bergen-Hiltrop is a statistical area in the working-class north of Bochum, between Gerthe and Riemke.

Bochum